Faith Chepngetich Kipyegon (born 10 January 1994) is a Kenyan middle-distance runner specializing in the 1500 metres. A 2016 Rio Olympic and 2020 Tokyo Olympic champion with the Games record at the latter, she is the second woman in history to claim back-to-back Olympic titles at the event. On the track Kipyegon has won or finished second in every major championships since 2015, and is regarded the greatest female 1500 metres runner in history.

She is a two-time world champion from 2017 and 2022 as well as two-time world silver medallist from 2015, when she lost only to the multiple world record-holder Genzebe Dibaba, and 2019, when she returned after giving birth in previous year. In August 2022, she achieved the second-fastest time in history, setting her consecutive Kenyan record.

Kipyegon won her specialist event at the 2011 World Under-18 Championships, and 2012 World U20 Championships. At the age of 18, she did not reach semifinals of the 2012 London Olympics, but won the junior races at the 2011 and 2013 World Cross Country Championships, and finished fifth at the 2013 World Championships. She was 2014 Commonwealth Games champion, and a three-time Diamond League winner.

Kipyegon was cited as one of the Top 100 most influential Africans by New African magazine in 2017.

Career

Junior career

At age 16, Faith Kipyegon ran in the 2010 World Cross Country Championships women's junior race in Bydgoszcz, Poland. She came in fourth place individually and won the gold medal with her under-20 team.

She participated in the 2011 World Cross Country Championships in Punta Umbria, Spain and took the gold medal in the junior race, adding silver with her team. A few months afterward, she competed in the 1500 m at the World Youth Championships in Lille, France winning a gold medal ahead of two Ethiopian runners with a time of 4:9.48 and breaking a championship record in the process.

At the 2012 World Junior Championships held in Barcelona, Kipyegon won the gold medal in her specialist event way ahead of the field with a time of 4:04.96; the Serbian Amela Terzić and Ethiopian Senbere Teferi took second and third place respectively. That time she also set a championship record. The then 18-year-old qualified for the London Olympics, but at the event failed to advance to the semi-finals clocking 4:08.78.

At the beginning of the 2013 season, she took a gold in the junior race both with her team at the World Cross Country Championships in Bydgoszcz, Poland. On 10 May, at the Diamond League meeting in Doha, Qatar, she established a Kenyan record in the 1500 m with a time of 3:56.98, facing the Swedish runner Abeba Aregawi. In August, at the Moscow World Championships, the 19-year-old came fifth in the final in a time of 4:05.08.

Senior career

2014: Commonwealth champion
In May, she was a part of the team which won the gold medal in the 4×1500 m relay at the first IAAF World Relays in Nassau, Bahamas, along with Mercy Cherono, Irene Jelagat and Hellen Obiri. The Kenyan team, ahead of the United States and Australia, set a new world record of 16:33.58. The same year in July, she became Commonwealth Games 1500 m champion in Glasgow, Scotland in a time of 4:08.94.

2015: World championship silver medallist
On 25 August, Kipyegon won a silver in the 1500 m event at the World Championships held in Beijing. After a tactical race she finished in a time of 4:08.96 second to Ethiopia's world record holder Genzebe Dibaba who clocked 4:08.09. Siffan Hassan representing the Netherlands was third in 4:09.34.

On 11 September, at the Diamond League meeting in Brussels, she won the one mile with an African and a meet record of 4:16.71, beating Hassan who ran 4:18.20 in the final stretch.

2016: First Olympic title in Rio
On 14 May, Kipyegon improved her own 2013 1500 m Kenyan record by running 3:56.82 when winning Diamond League Shanghai Golden Grand Prix meeting. Two weeks later, she bested her record with a 3:56.41 performance to place first at the Prefontaine Classic in Eugene, Oregon. She also won the mile event during Oslo Bislett Games meet in June.

The then 22-year-old became 2016 Olympic Games 1500 m gold medallist in Rio de Janeiro reversing the order from the previous year's World Championships. She outsprinted Dibaba in the final 200 m in what was initially a slow tactical race, with a third lap in 56.80 and last 800 m in a fast 800m races pace of 1:57.2. Kipyegon clocked 4:08.92, Dibaba 4:10.27, and Jenny Simpson was third in 4:10.53.

2017: First world title

She earned her first Diamond League 1500 m title, winning three races in Shanghai, Eugene, and Brussels.

Her best success of that year was the first place at the London World Championships, becoming only the third woman in history to win both the Olympic and World Championships 1500 m race. She ran 4:02.59 while three next women also recorded times below 4:03, with Jenny Simpson in second and Caster Semenya third .

2018–2020: World championship silver medallist
Kipyegon gave birth to her first child in 2018, returning 12 months later, in June 2019, to win her signature event in 3:59:04 at the Prefontaine Classic in Palo Alto.

She went on to take the silver medal at the World Championships in Doha, where she set her new Kenyan record of 3:54.22. Sifan Hassan came first in 3:51.95 while the third-placed Gudaf Tsegay set a best of 3:54.38.

In 2020, she competed at the Diamond League and Continental Tour meetings staying unbeaten in all her six races. In August, she ran the second-fastest time ever, an African and Diamond League record in the 1000 metres at the Herculis meet in Monaco, with her result of 2:29.15 just 0.17 s short of the world record set back in 1996.

2021: Second back-to-back Olympic title in Tokyo
In 2021, she improved her Kenyan national record twice at the Diamond League meetings. On 10 June, she ran 3:53.91 at the Rome Golden Gala, staged exceptionally in Florence, to finish second just behind Sifan Hassan who timed 3:53.63. On 9 July at the Monaco Herculis, Kipyegon stopped the clock at a world-leading 3:51.07 – the fourth-fastest time in history and just one second off Genzebe Dibaba's world record – outsprinting Hassan in the home straight by about 2.5 s.

At the women's 1500 m final of the delayed 2020 Tokyo Olympics in August, Kipyegon overtook Hassan in the last 200 m to secure her second consecutive Olympic gold medal in the event in a time of 3:53.11, breaking an Olympic record which had stood for 33 years. She became the second woman in history to win back-to-back Olympic 1500 m titles. While Hassan faded in the home stretch (3:55.86) Laura Muir set a British record of 3:54.50 to clinch the silver medal.

In September, she beat Hassan again at the Zürich Weltklasse Diamond League final to take her second 1500 m Diamond Trophy. Kipyegon won nine out of her ten races of the season.

2022: Second world title

At the World Championships in Eugene, Oregon in July, Kipyegon won decisively the 1500 m gold medal with a time of 3:52.96, which made her the first female athlete to win four global titles over the distance. Gudaf Tsegay placed second in 3:54.52 while Laura Muir earned bronze (3:55.28).

In August at the Diamond League's Monaco meet, Kipyegon set a new national record of 3:50.37, the second-fastest performance of all time and just 0.3 s off the Dibaba's world record which was set also in Monaco in 2015. She split 60.5 / 62.1 / 62.1 / 45.67 (last 400 m in 61.3) and as of August 2022 held six of the thirteen fastest women's 1500 m performances in history. She ended her yet another successful season with a clear victory in Zürich circuit's final the following month, this time closing strongly after a tactical race (last lap in 57.75 and last 200 m in 27.8) to earn her third Diamond League 1500 m title. Kipyegon won all her six 1500 m races of the season.

In November interview with Athletics Weekly, she said that in the future she would like to run marathons.

2023
Kipyegon got her 2023 campaign off to strong start on 4 February with a dominant victory at the Sirikwa Cross Country Classic (10 km) in home Eldoret.

Personal life
Kipyegon is married to middle-distance runner Timothy Kitum, the 2012 Olympic 800 m bronze medallist. They have a daughter, Alyn, born in June 2018. She returned to training in January 2019 after almost 18-month break. Six months later, Kipyegon competed in her first race since giving birth, winning her specialty at the Diamond League's Prefontaine Classic in Palo Alto.

She trains in Kaptagat coached by Patrick Sang (who is also coaching marathon world record-holder Eliud Kipchoge).

Achievements
All information taken from World Athletics profile.

Personal bests

International competitions

Circuit wins and titles
 Diamond League champion 1500 m (3):  2017,  2021,  2022
 2015 (1) One Mile: Brussels Memorial Van Damme
 2016 [3]; 1500 m (2): Shanghai Diamond League, Eugene Prefontaine Classic; One Mile (1): Oslo Bislett Games
 2017 (3) 1500 m: Shanghai, Eugene, Brussels
 2019 (1) 1500 m: Prefontaine Classic in Palo Alto
 2020 [3]; 1000 m (2): Monaco Herculis, Brussels; 800 m (1): Doha Diamond League
 2021 [4]; 800 m (1): Doha; 1500 m (3): Monaco, Eugene (MR), Zürich Weltklasse
 2022 (3) 1500 m: Eugene (WL MR), Monaco Herculis (WL NR), Zürich
 World Athletics Cross Country Tour
 2022–23: Sirikwa Cross Country Classic

National titles
 Kenyan Cross Country Championships
 Senior women's race: 2014, 2015

Awards and honours
 Kenyan Sports Personality of the Year – Sportswoman of the Year: 2021, 2022

See also
List of Olympic medalists in athletics (women)
List of 2016 Summer Olympics medal winners
List of African Olympic medalists
List of World Athletics Championships medalists (women)
List of Commonwealth Games medallists in athletics (women)
1500 metres at the Olympics
1500 metres at the World Championships in Athletics

References

External links

 

Living people
1994 births
People from Bomet County
Kalenjin people
Kenyan female middle-distance runners
Kenyan female cross country runners
Olympic female middle-distance runners
Olympic athletes of Kenya
Olympic gold medalists for Kenya
Olympic gold medalists in athletics (track and field)
Athletes (track and field) at the 2012 Summer Olympics
Athletes (track and field) at the 2016 Summer Olympics
Athletes (track and field) at the 2020 Summer Olympics
Medalists at the 2016 Summer Olympics
Medalists at the 2020 Summer Olympics
Commonwealth Games gold medallists for Kenya
Commonwealth Games gold medallists in athletics
Athletes (track and field) at the 2014 Commonwealth Games
World Athletics Championships athletes for Kenya
World Athletics Championships medalists
World Athletics Championships winners
African Cross Country Championships winners
Diamond League winners
World Athletics record holders (relay)
Commonwealth Games competitors for Kenya
Medallists at the 2014 Commonwealth Games